Max Lorenz may refer to:
Max Lorenz (tenor)
Max Lorenz (footballer)
Max O. Lorenz, American economist, responsible for the Lorenz curve

See also
Max Lorentz, Swedish musician